Arthur Fredrick Shaw (born 1 August 1869) was an English footballer who played in The Football League for Loughborough, Notts County and Nottingham Forest.

References

1869 births
1946 deaths
English footballers
Notts County F.C. players
Nottingham Forest F.C. players
Loughborough F.C. players
English Football League players
Association football forwards